The Fuller Report is a 1968 Italian-French Eurospy film directed by Sergio Grieco and starring Ken Clark and Beba Loncar. The theme song "Touch of Kiss" is performed by Lara Saint Paul.

Plot

Dick Worth is a race car driver and becomes entangled in espionage.

Cast 

 Ken Clark  as  Dick Worth
  Beba Loncar as Svetlana Golyadkin
  Lincoln Tate as Pearson
 Jess Hahn  as  Eddy Bennet
  Paolo Gozlino as  Max
 Serge Marquand  as Bonjasky
 Mirko Ellis as  Jimmy
 Claudio Biava as  Bonjasky's Henchman
 Gianni Brezza as  Clay 
 Lars Passgård  as  Knut
  Max Turilli as The Doctor

References

External links

1968 films
1960s spy thriller films
Italian spy thriller films
French spy thriller films
Films directed by Sergio Grieco
1960s French films
1960s Italian films
1960s Italian-language films